The 2001 Baltic Cup football competition was the 19th season of the Baltic Cup and took place on from 3–5 July 2001 at the Daugava Stadium in Riga, Latvia, after it had not been staged for three years. It was the ninth  competition of the three Baltic states; Latvia, Lithuania and Estonia; since they regained their independence from the Soviet Union in 1991.

Results

Latvia vs Estonia

Lithuania vs Estonia

Latvia vs Lithuania

Final table

Winners

Statistics

Goalscorers

See also
Balkan Cup
Nordic Football Championship

References

External links
RSSSF
omnitel

Baltic Cup (football)
Baltic Cup
Baltic Cup
Baltic Cup
International association football competitions hosted by Latvia
Baltic Cup 2001
Football in Riga